Eye ring may refer to:
 Eye ring, also called a "lover's eye ring", a type of antique ring
Eye-ring, tiny feathers that surrounds the orbital ring of some birds
Periorbital dark circles, dark blemishes around the eyes.
Limbal ring, a dark ring around the iris of the eye, where the sclera meets the cornea.